Not to Disappear is the second studio album by British indie folk band Daughter, released on 15 January 2016 by 4AD. In anticipation of the album, a music video for the promotional single "Doing the Right Thing" was released on 30 September 2015. A music video for the single "Numbers" followed in November 2015. The album cover is "The World is Spinning Around", a painting by British artist Sarah Shaw.

Critical reception

Not to Disappear received generally positive reviews from critics. Annie Zaleski of The A.V. Club found that Daughter's "brutal lyrical honesty" sets them apart from musical antecedents such as The Cure, PJ Harvey and Beach House. Sonic Seducer said that the band had created a dynamic mixture of indie pop, folk and shoegaze that reflected influences from bands such as London Grammar and Massive Attack. Marcy Donelson of AllMusic called the album "elegant, moving, and often beautiful", as well as sufficiently dynamic despite its reliance on "sound-defining delay, a dark tone palette, and friable vocals". Rolling Stones Amy Rose Spiegel was more critical, finding that the minimal instrumentation "can highlight the monotony of Tonra's gorgeous, but largely static, vocal phrasing".

Accolades

Track listing

Personnel
Daughter
 Igor Haefeli – production, arrangements
 Remi Aguilella – additional production, arrangements
 Elena Tonra – arrangements

Additional contributors
 Nicolas Vernhes – production
 Joe Lambert – mastering
 David Tolomei – engineering
 Alison Fielding – art direction, design
 Sarah Shaw – paintings

Charts

Weekly charts

Year-end charts

References

2016 albums
4AD albums
Daughter (band) albums
Glassnote Records albums